Byera Hill is a town on the east coast of Saint Vincent, in Saint Vincent and the Grenadines. It is located to the south of  Georgetown, on the coast road linking it with the capital Kingstown.

References
Scott, C. R. (ed.) (2005) Insight guide: Caribbean (5th edition). London: Apa Publications.

Populated places in Saint Vincent and the Grenadines